Trempealeau is a village located along the Mississippi River in Trempealeau County in the U.S. state of Wisconsin. The population was 1,843 at the 2020 census. The village is surrounded by the Town of Trempealeau.

History
An ancient Native American site with earthwork mounds, also known as Trempealeau, has been studied near the village through archeological excavations in the 21st century. It is theorized as a possible mission site or colony of Cahokia, the major center of Mississippian culture from 1000CE to 1450CE located 500 miles to the south in present-day Illinois near St. Louis, Missouri.

Studies have been done through the Mississippi Valley Archaeology Center associated with the University of Wisconsin Madison. Archeologists Danielle Benden and Robert “Ernie” Boszhardt said they have found some evidence of Mississippian settlement about 1050E. The newcomers are believed to have introduced corn culture to the area. The archeology site is slightly downriver of the prominent landmark, Trempealeau Mountain. In 2013 evidence was found of several former structures that exhibited characteristics of Mississippian style. There is some evidence that a religious group came here from Cahokia, perhaps fleeing persecution.

European-American settlement did not take place here until the mid-19th century, although French and English fur traders interacted with Native Americans of the area from the colonial period and into the 19th century. A post office called Trempealeau was first established in 1852. The village was named after a nearby island in the Mississippi River, that named by a French explorer.

Geography
Trempealeau is located at  (44.006906, -91.434572).

Demographics

2020 census
As of the census of 2020, the population was 1,843. The racial makeup of the village was 94.0% White, 0.4% Asian, 0.3% Black or African American, 0.2% Native American, 0.5% from other races, and 4.6% from two or more races. Ethnically, the population was 2.0% Hispanic or Latino of any race.

According  to the American Community Survey estimates for 2016-2020, the median income for a household in the village was $56,383, and the median income for a family was $67,500. Male full-time workers had a median income of $45,278 versus $32,344 for female workers. The per capita income for the village was $30,328. About 2.7% of families and 4.1% of the population were below the poverty line, including 6.4% of those under age 18 and 3.6% of those age 65 or over. Of the population age 25 and over, 98.3% were high school graduates or higher and 20.8% had a bachelor's degree or higher.

2010 census
As of the census of 2010, there were 1,529 people, 704 households, and 426 families residing in the village. The racial makeup of the village was 97.8% White, 0.1% African American, 0.4% Native American, 0.4% Asian, 0.3% from other races, and 1.0% from two or more races. Hispanic or Latino of any race were 1.4% of the population.

There were 704 households, of which 27.3% had children under the age of 18 living with them, 47.7% were married couples living together, 8.2% had a female householder with no husband present, 4.5% had a male householder with no wife present, and 39.5% were non-families. 33.2% of all households were made up of individuals, and 13.6% had someone living alone who was 65 years of age or older. The average household size was 2.17 and the average family size was 2.74.

The median age in the village was 42.7 years. 20.9% of residents were under the age of 18; 6.4% were between the ages of 18 and 24; 26.7% were from 25 to 44; 28.8% were from 45 to 64; and 17.1% were 65 years of age or older. The gender makeup of the village was 49.8% male and 50.2% female.

Notable people
Gideon Winans Allen, Wisconsin State Representative
Robert Grimes Coman, U.S. Navy Commodore
Charles Kenneth Leith, geologist
Todd Auer, NFL Pro Football Player

Images

See also
 Trempealeau Mountain State Natural Area

References

External links

 Village of Trempealeau Official Website
 Trempealeau.net
 Sanborn fire insurance maps: 1894 1900 1910

Villages in Trempealeau County, Wisconsin
Villages in Wisconsin
Archaeological sites in Wisconsin
Middle Mississippian culture
Wisconsin populated places on the Mississippi River